5 Alive! is the first live album released by the band Carbon Leaf. It was recorded over five concerts in the autumn and winter of 2002 and released in 2003 on the band's own label, Constant Ivy Music. It is their last release on their own label prior to signing with Vanguard Records in 2004.

Track listing

References

Carbon Leaf albums
2003 live albums